Hell Bent is a 1918 American Western film directed by John Ford and featuring Harry Carey. A print of the film exists in the Czechoslovak Film Archive.

Plot
As described in a film magazine, Bess Thurston (Gerber), whose no-account brother Jack (Pegg) is unable to support her, obtains employment in a dance hall. This shatters the illusions of Cheyenne Harry (Carey), who has fallen in love with her. When he rescues her from the advances of Beau Ross (Harris), Cheyenne's confidence in her is restored. Her brother then aids Beau in an attempted robbery and Harry allows them to escape. Beau takes Bess with him into the desert. Harry follows and a duel ensues in which they are both wounded. Bess rides the only horse left out of the desert, while Beau and Harry struggle along on foot. A sandstorm results in the death of Beau, but Harry lives to find happiness with Bess.

Cast
 Harry Carey as Cheyenne Harry
 Duke R. Lee as Cimmaron Bill (credited as Duke Lee)
 Neva Gerber as Bess Thurston
 Vester Pegg as Jack Thurston
 Joe Harris as Beau Ross (credited as Joseph Harris)
 Steve Clemente as Undetermined Role
 Millard K. Wilson as Undetermined Role
 Molly Malone as Undetermined Role

Reception
Like many American films of the time, Hell Bent was subject to restrictions and cuts by city and state film censorship boards. For example, the Chicago Board of Censors cut, in Reel 1, all scenes of the stage holdup, Reel 4, two scenes of men working at safe, all scenes of holdup on coach, Reel 5, binding man to horse, and three scenes of bandits in cabin shooting.

Restoration and home video
In 2019, the film was digitally restored by Universal Pictures and released the following year on Blu-ray and DVD by Kino Lorber.

See also
 Harry Carey filmography

References

External links
 

1918 films
1918 Western (genre) films
American black-and-white films
Films directed by John Ford
Silent American Western (genre) films
1910s American films
1910s English-language films